Bianca Hunter (born September 20, 1969) is an American actress. She is best known for her roles in The Fighter (2010), Trees Lounge (1996), and Bad Lieutenant (1992).

Career
Bianca Hunter's first appearance was an uncredited role at the age of 3 in a scene with Al Pacino in Serpico (1973), directed by Sidney Lumet. In 1986 she appeared in the music video "Papa Don't Preach" by Madonna with Danny Aiello and Debi Mazar. At 18, Hunter played Karen Hill's (Lorraine Bracco) best friend in the wedding scene in Goodfellas (1990). After seeing her harrowing portrayal of a teen being sexually harassed by Harvey Keitel in Abel Ferrara's Bad Lieutenant (1992), Steve Buscemi cast her in his directorial debut Trees Lounge (1996). She has appeared in a dozen films including the David O. Russell-directed biographical film The Fighter (2010), nominated for seven Academy Awards and winning the awards for Best Supporting Actor (Christian Bale) and Best Supporting Actress (Melissa Leo). Hunter portrayed one of the seven sisters of Christian Bale and Mark Wahlberg. Despite receiving positive critical reception for her performance in The Fighter, resulting in several nominations and wins for Best Ensemble Cast, Hunter has never achieved the same success or accolades in subsequent roles.

Personal life
Hunter was born and raised in New York City. Her father, William Hunter, is an artist and her mother, Pat Hunter Hicklin, a former model turned Montessori school teacher. After high school, Hunter married NYC punk band Reagan Youth guitarist and co-founder Paul Bakija and is credited as Bianca Bakija in her first two movie roles. She is now married to her third husband Robert MacNaughton, who portrayed Elliot's older brother in E.T. the Extra-Terrestrial. They were set up on a blind date by mutual friend, MacNaughton's E.T. co-star Drew Barrymore when Hunter was a teenager. Together they have four sons, Henry, Harley, Hunter, and Noah.

Filmography

References

External links 
 

Year of birth missing (living people)
Living people
American child actresses
20th-century American actresses
21st-century American actresses
1969 births